Alcide was a 64-gun ship of the line of the French Navy, launched in 1742. The captain of the vessel was Toussaint Hocquart, for the re-enforcement campaign that was sent to Canada in May 1755.

On 8 June 1755, Alcide was captured by HMS Dunkirk and HMS Torbay of Vice-Admiral Edward Boscawen's squadron, and commissioned into the Royal Navy in 1757 as the third-rate HMS Alcide.

HMS Alcide was sold out of the navy in May 1772. However, it perhaps remained in service in some form because on 10 July 1772 according to the UK, Register of Duties Paid for Apprentices' Indentures, 1710–1811, Robert Mellefent was apprenticed as a carpenter to Ebenezer Holland to serve on the ship.

See also
 List of ships captured in the 18th century
 Father Le Loutre's War

Notes

References

Lavery, Brian, The Ship of the Line – Volume 1: The development of the battlefleet 1650–1850. Conway Maritime Press, 2003. .
Winfield, Rif, British Warships in the Age of Sail, 1714–1792: Design, Construction, Careers and Fates. Seaforth Publishing, 2007. .

Ships of the line of the French Navy
Alcide (1755)
1743 ships
Captured ships